Laurie Rachel Batista López (born 29 May 1996) is a Panamanian footballer who plays as a midfielder for Tauro FC and the Panama women's national team.

International career
Batista appeared in five matches for Panama at the 2018 CONCACAF Women's Championship.

See also
 List of Panama women's international footballers

References

1996 births
Living people
Panamanian women's footballers
Women's association football midfielders
Panama women's international footballers
Pan American Games competitors for Panama
Footballers at the 2019 Pan American Games